Enedina Lloris Camps (born 1957 in Alfara del Patriarca) is a Valencian soprano. Lloris retired early from the opera stage and teaches at ESMUC.

References

1957 births
Living people
20th-century Spanish women opera singers